Irwell may refer to:

 River Irwell in England
 Irwell River (New Zealand)
 , a British freight ship 
 Irwell, New Zealand, a place in New Zealand
 Irwell (taps), Australian producer of tapware